Zam is a commune in Hunedoara County, Transylvania, Romania. It is composed of thirteen villages: Almaș-Săliște (Almásszelistye), Almășel (Almasel), Brășeu (Brassó), Cerbia (Cserbia), Deleni, Godinești (Godinesd), Micănești (Mikanesd), Pogănești (Poganesd), Pojoga (Pozsga), Sălciva (Szolcsva), Tămășești (Tamasesd), Valea, and Zam.

The commune is located in the northwestern part of the county, on the border with Arad County. It lies on the banks of the Mureș River, with the villages of Pojoga and Sălciva on the left bank and the other component villages on the right bank. The river Almaș flows into the Mureș in Cerbia, while its right tributary, Valea Mare, flows into the Almaș in Pogănești; the river Zam flows into the Mureș in the village of Zam.

The Zam train station serves the CFR Line 200, which runs from Brașov to Curtici.

Natives
 Francisc Hossu-Longin

References

Communes in Hunedoara County
Localities in Transylvania